Hervé Claude (born 19 November 1945 in Paris) is a French television journalist and writer.

Biography  
Hervé Claude was a news anchor for Antenne 2 and France 2 from 1975 to 1994. He has worked since this date on Arte. He hosted the religious program Agape one Sunday a month, on France 2 in connection with the religious show The day of the Lord until January 2010 and from May 2010 in a shorter form (the show shortened from 52 to 26 minutes).

Hervé Claude wrote a dozen novels. Requins et Coquins  is the second in the noir book series after Riches, cruels et fardés. In September 2007, he released the last volume of the trilogy Mort d'une drag-queen. He also published a noir crime novel collection under the title number 24 entitled Cocu de sac. A Television journalist, he mainly works for Arte and he lives several months a year in Australia.

Hervé Claude was married from 1972 to 1976 to Françoise Kramer since then he is in a civil union with sculptor Matei Negreanu.

Works

Novels  
 Conduite à gauche, Ramsay, 1984
Réédition Le Livre de Poche  4366
 L'Enfant à l'oreille cassée, Ramsay, 1986
Réédition J'ai lu  2753
 Le Désespoir des singes, Flammarion, 1989
Réédition J'ai lu  2788
 Le Jeu de la rue du Loup, Flammarion, 1992
 Les Amnésiques, Flammarion, 1995
 Le Journaliste, le Hasard et la Guenon, Seuil, 1996
 Une image irréprochable, Ramsay, 1998
 Riches, cruels et fardés, Gallimard,  "Série noire", 2002
Réédition Gallimard,  "Folio policier"  511
 Requins et Coquins, Gallimard,  " Série noire", 2003
 Pique-nique à marée basse, 2007
 Mort d'une drag-queen, Actes Sud,  "Babel noir"  12, 2007
 Cocu de sac, La Branche,  "Suite noire", 2008
 Nickel chrome, Actes Sud,  " Actes noirs", 2009
 Les ours s'embrassent pour mourir, Actes Sud,  " Actes noirs", 2010
 Mort d'un papy voyageur, Baleine,  "Le Poulpe"  271, 2010
 Les Mâchoires du serpent, Actes Sud,  "Actes noirs", 2012

Other  
 Matei Negreanu, Vers les arts, 1993
Cowritten with Dominique Narran and Helmut Ricke.

Notes and references

External links  
 Archive INA   : newscast of antenna 2 of 14 August 1983 Presented by Hervé Claude

1945 births
Living people
French television presenters
French crime fiction writers
21st-century French novelists
20th-century French novelists
20th-century French male writers
French journalists
21st-century French male writers
French male non-fiction writers